Adams Crossroads is an unincorporated community in Cherokee County, Alabama, United States.

History
The community was named for W. S. Adams, an early settler.

Demographics
According to the returns from 1850-2010 for Alabama, it has never reported a population figure separately on the U.S. Census.

References

Unincorporated communities in Cherokee County, Alabama
Unincorporated communities in Alabama